Nedo Fiano (Florence, 22 April 1925 - Milan, 19 December 2020) was an Italian Jewish writer and Holocaust survivor. He was a survivor of the Auschwitz concentration camp.

He was one of the most active contemporary witnesses to the experience of the Holocaust in Italy.

References 

1925 births
2020 deaths
20th-century Italian Jews
Writers from Florence
Auschwitz concentration camp survivors